Hemitoma is a genus of slit limpets, marine gastropod molluscs in the family Fissurellidae, the keyhole limpets and slit limpets.

In this genus of fissurellid, there is an inconspicuous notch at the anterior end of the shell rather than a slit. The notch is best seen in an interior view of the shell.

Species
Species within the genus Hemitoma include:
 Hemitoma australis (Quoy & Gaimard, 1832)
 Hemitoma bella  Gabb, 1865

According to the World Register of Marine Species (WoRMS) the following species names have been accepted 
 Hemitoma cumingii Sowerby, 1863 
 Hemitoma imbricata (Adams, 1851)
 Hemitoma octoradiata (Gmelin, 1791)
 Hemitoma polygonalis (Adams, 1852)

The Indo-Pacific Molluscan Database also includes the following species with names in current use 
 Hemitoma arabica (Adams, 1852)
 Hemitoma modesta (Adams, 1872)
 Hemitoma subrugosa Thiele, 1916
 Hemitoma simpla Christiaens, 1987
Subgenus Montfortia, Récluz, 1843 accepted as the genus Montfortia Récluz, 1843
 Hemitoma cratitia (Adams, 1852)
 Subgenus Montfortista, Iredale, 1929
 Hemitoma oldhamiana (Nevill, 1869)

Species brought into synonymy
 Hemitoma emarginata (Blainville, 1825): synonym of  Montfortia emarginata (Blainville, 1825)
 Hemitoma excentrica (Iredale, 1929): synonym of Montfortista excentrica (Iredale, 1929)
 Hemitoma hermosa Lowe, 1935: synonym of Montfortia hermosa (Lowe, 1935)
 Hemitoma livescens (Reeve, 1865): synonym of Cellana livescens (Reeve, 1855)
 Hemitoma natlandi Durham, 1950: synonym of Octomarginula natlandi (Durham, 1950)
 Hemitoma panhi (Quoy & Gaimard, 1834): synonym of Montfortista panhi (Quoy & Gaimard, 1834)
 Hemitoma profunda (Deshayes, 1863): synonym of Eoacmaea profunda (Deshayes, 1863)
 Hemitoma rubida Verrill, 1850: synonym of Hemitoma octoradiata (Gmelin, 1791)
 Hemitoma subemarginata (Blainville, 1819): synonym of Montfortia subemarginata (Blainville, 1819)
 Hemitoma tricarinata (Born, 1778): synonym of Amathina tricarinata (Linnaeus, 1767)

References

 Vaught, K.C. (1989). A classification of the living Mollusca. American Malacologists: Melbourne, FL (USA). . XII, 195 pp. 
 McLean J.H. (2011) Reinstatement of the fissurellid subfamily Hemitominae, with the description of new genera, and proposed evolutionary lineage, based on morphological characters of shell and radula (Gastropoda: Vetigastropoda). Malacologia 54(1-2): 407-427
 ITIS 
 Worms 

Fissurellidae

nl:Emarginula